Alonsa is a rural municipality (RM) in the province of Manitoba, western Canada. It lies on the west side of Lake Manitoba.

The park is currently under lease to a private operator but development plans include a provincial campground and day use facility.

The incorporation of Alonsa on 1 January 1945 was as a Local Government District (LGD). It received rural municipality status on 1 January 1997.

Communities

 Alonsa
 Amaranth
 Bacon Ridge
 Bluff Creek
 Cayer
 Eddystone
 Harcus
 Kinosota (Manitoba House)
 Lonely Lake
 Moore Dale
 Portia
 Reedy Creek
 Reykjavik
 Shergrove
 Silver Ridge

Demographics 

References

External links
Rural Municipality of Alonsa
Manitoba Historical Society – Rural Municipality of Alonsa
 Map of Alonsa R.M. at Statcan

Alonsa